Dead or Dreaming is the second full-length studio album by Canadian melodic death metal and progressive metal band Into Eternity.  It was released by DVS Records in 2001 and re-released by Century Media Records on 2002.

Track listing
 All songs written, performed, and arranged by Into Eternity
 All lyrics written by Tim Roth
 All songs: 2001 Into Eternity

Personnel
Credits are adapted from the album's liner notes.

Into Eternity
 Daniel Nargang − lead/backing vocals, guitar 
 Jim Austin − drums, death vocals
 Tim Roth − lead/death vocals, guitar
 Scott Krall − bass, backing vocals

Additional musicians
 Chris McDougall − keyboards
 Amy Ozog − additional vocals on "Elysium Dream", "Selling God" and "Cyber Messiah"

Production and other
 Produced by Into Eternity. Assisted by Kelly Churko, Johny "Six Pack" Gasparic
 Recorded, mixed & mastered – January to July 2001 at Touchwood Studios, Regina, SK, Canada
 Mixed & mastered by Grant Hall. Assisted by Kelly Churko and Into Eternity
 Engineered by Kelly Churko, Johny "Six Pack" Gasparic & Grant Hall
 Keyboards produced, engineered and recorded by Russ Whyte at Whyte Media Publishing
 Artwork & design by Mattias Norén.
 Band photo by Darrol Hofmeister

References

External links
 Dead or Dreaming Album Discography
 Century Media Audio Studio

2001 albums
Into Eternity (band) albums
Century Media Records albums